Kerstin Lucia Ahlqvist (married Winnberg) (11 July 1927 – 2 October 2000) was a Swedish alpine skier. She competed in two events at the 1952 Winter Olympics.

References

External links
 

1927 births
2000 deaths
Swedish female alpine skiers
Olympic alpine skiers of Sweden
Alpine skiers at the 1952 Winter Olympics
People from Frösön
Sportspeople from Jämtland County
20th-century Swedish women